This list shows recipients of the title "National Heroes of Sri Lanka"

List of National Heroes 

 Pandara Vanniyan - 1982

Great Rebellion of 1817–18 
Leaders (19) of the Great Rebellion of 1817–18 who were labeled by the British as traitors, made National Heroes on 8 December 2016.

 Keppitipola, late Desave of Ouva
 Godegedera, Late Adikarame of Ouva
 Ketakala Mohattale of Ouva
 Maha Betmerale of Kataragama in Ouva
 Kuda Betmerale of Kataragama in Ouva
 Palegolle Mohattale of Kataragama in Ouva
 Wattekeyle Mohattale of Kataragama in Ouva
 Polgahagedare Rehenerale of Kataragama in Ouva
 Passerewatte Vidane of Kataragama in Ouva
 Kiwulegedere Mohottale of Walapane
 Kalugamuwe Mohottale of Walapane
 Udamadure Mohottale of Walapane
 Kohukumbure Rate Rala of Wellassa
 Kohukumbure Walauwe Mohottale of Wellassa
 Butawe Rate Rale of Wellassa
 Baginigahawela Rate Rale of Wellassa
 Maha Badullegammene Rate Rale of Wellassa
 Bulupitiye Mohottale of Wellassa
 Palle Malheyae Gametirale of Wellassa
 

Participants (49) of the Great Rebellion of 1817–18 who were sentenced to death by the Martial Court, made National Heroes on 11 September 2017.

 Appurala Arachchila, Uva
 Appuhamy Arachchila, Uva
 Arampola (Loku) Mohottala, Sath Koralaya
 Aluthnuwara Appuwa, Sabaragamuwa
 Aluthnuwara Naideral], Sabaragamuwa
 Aluvihare Nilame, Matale
 Ellepola Maha Nilame, Matale
 Idamegama Ganethirala, Uva Medakinda
 Iriyagama Kalubanda, Yatinuwara
 Udapalathe Vidane
 Kalugalpitiye Vidane
 Kepettipola Maha Nilame, Matale
 Kindi Menika Duraya, Sabaragamuwa
 Kirinaida (First)
 Kirinaida (Second)
 Kiriminda
 Kivulegedara Mohottala, Viyaluwa
 Kuda Badulugammana Raterala, Wellassa
 Kumbakele Shilpa
 Kethukurala, Sath Koralaya
 Kotabowe Magalarawe Mohottala, Wellassa
 Ganitha Uva
 Thennewatte Disawa, Dumbara
 Diyakele Pihanarala
 Deegolle Raterala, Uva
 Dewdiya Raterala, Uva Yatikinda
 Dewagolle Hondahami, Sabaragamuwa
 Nindagame Dinga
 Tikirala Alias Kandukara Arachchi
 Tikiri Rala
 Pelawa Mahaduraya
 Puncha/Pinchi
 Polgahagedara Pihanarala, Uva
 Butawe Raterala, Wellassa
 Boragolle Mohottala, Walapane
 Bodimaluwe Vidane, Sabaragamuwa
 Madugalle Udagabada Nilame, Dumbara
 Madulle Aruma]], Walapane
 Madulle Ganethirala, Walapane
 Madulle Punchirala, Walpane
 Mawathagama Nilame, Sath Koralaya
 Medagasthalawe Basnayaka Rala
 Wadawela Mohottala, Uva
 Welarawe Raterala, Uva
 Sedara, Sabaragamuwa
 Hakmana Thennewatte Nilame, Dumbara
 Hannasgedara Mohottala, Matale
 Haloluwe Kuda Sattambi, Harispattuwa
 Higgahalande Vidane, Uva

Participants (32) of the Great Rebellion of 1817–18 who were declared as "betrayers" and expelled to Mauritius by the Martial Court, made National Heroes on 11 September 2017.

 Ambagaspitiye Lekam, Dumbara
 Amunugama Hitapu Kunam Maduwe Lekam, Dumbara
 Ihagama Unnanse, Harispattuwa
 Iriyagama Nilame, Yatinuwara
 Iriyagama Rate Mahathmaya, Yatinuwara
 Ketakele Mohottala, Uva
 Ketakumbure Hitapu Rate Mahathmaya, Udunuwara
 Kurukohogama Kiribanda, Dumbara
 Kempitiye Korala, Sathara Koralaya
 Kohukumbure Raterala, Wellassa
 Galagoda Kotte Disa Mahathmaya, Hewaheta
 Godegedara Adikaram, Wellassa
 Thalagune Wannaku Nilame, Dumbara
 Dangamuwe Mohottala, Uva Yatikinda
 Dedunupitiya Mohottala, Thumpane Palle Palatha
 Demodara Mohottala, Sabaragamuwa
 Dodamwala Banda
 Pitawala Lekam Mahathmaya, Dumbara
 Pilimathalawe Nilame, Yatinuwara
 Maththemagoda Thamankaduwa Disawa, Thumpane
 Mathethemagoda Thun Korale Disawa, Thumpane
 Meegahapitiye Raterala, Wellassa
 Meewathure Hitapu Lekam, Yatinuwara
 Rahupola Pihanarala, Uva Udukinda
 Wattekele Mohottala, Uva Soranathota
 Walpalagolle Muhandiram, Thumpane Ganata Palatha
 Wettewe Hitapu Rate Mahathmaya, Thumpane Uda Palatha
 Hapathgamuwa (Loku) Mohottala, Viyaluwa
 Hapathgamuwe (Kuda) Mohottala, Viyaluwa
 Kanawerelle Raterala, Uva
 Karane Raterala
 Kurugahagama Kiribanda

Matale rebellion 

 Puran Appu
 Gongalegoda Banda
 Kadahapola thero

Sri Lankan independence movement 
Incomplete

 Anagarika Dharmapala
 C. W. W. Kannangara
 D. R. Wijewardena
 Don Stephen Senanayake
 E. W. Perera
 Fredrick Richard Senanayake
 Henry Pedris
 James Peiris
 Ponnambalam Arunachalam
 Ponnambalam Ramanathan
 Tuan Burhanudeen Jayah
 A. Ekanayake Gunasinha
 Arthur V. Dias
 Charles Edgar Corea
 Don Baron Jayatilaka
 George E. de Silva
 Gratien Fernando
 Henry Woodward Amarasuriya
 Herbert Sri Nissanka
 Leslie Goonewardene
 M. C. Siddi Lebbe
 Madduma Bandara Ehelapola
 N. M. Perera
 Philip Gunawardena
 S. Mahinda
 Susantha de Fonseka
 Thomas Amarasuriya
 Victor Corea
 Vivienne Goonewardena
 W. A. de Silva
 Walisinghe Harischandra
 Wilmot A. Perera

References

Bibliography

 
Sri Lankan independence movement
Political history of Sri Lanka
Lists of Sri Lankan people